The Immortal Face is a 1947 Austrian historical drama film directed by Géza von Cziffra and starring Marianne Schönauer, O.W. Fischer and Helene Thimig. The film's sets were designed by the art director Fritz Jüptner-Jonstorff. Géza von Cziffra adapted the screenplay from his own 1943 play of the same title.

Cast
 Marianne Schönauer as 	Nana Risi
 O.W. Fischer as Anselm Feuerbach
 Helene Thimig as 	Henriette Feuerbach, seine Schwiegermutter 
 Siegfried Breuer as 	Fürst Catti
 Attila Hörbiger as 	Julius Allgeyer
 Dagny Servaes as 	Mutter Risi
 Heinrich Ortmayer as 	Giuseppe Risi
 Fritz Gehlen as Tonio Risi
 Till Hausmann as 	Klein Tonio
 Ditta Donnah as 	Lucia
 Erik Frey as 	Campbell
 Erich Ziegel as 	Rechtsanwalt Cipola
 C.W. Fernbach as 	Herr von Landshof 
 Ernst Waldbrunn as 	Baron Schlick
 Monika Peters as Hildegard von Schlick
 Gandolf Buschbeck as Alessandro
 Oskar Hugelmann as Pater Brazo
 Emmi Rügenau as 	Frau Belleguardia
 Helli Servi as 	Laura
 Ena Valduga as Frau Zuchi
 Erik Walter as 	Major Tivaldi
 Gustl Werner as 	Pietro, ein Diener

References

Bibliography 
 Fritsche, Maria. Homemade Men in Postwar Austrian Cinema: Nationhood, Genre and Masculinity. Berghahn Books, 2013.

External links 
 

1947 films
Austrian drama films
1947 drama films
1940s German-language films
Films directed by Géza von Cziffra
Austrian black-and-white films
Austrian historical films
1940s historical films
Films set in the 19th century
Austrian films based on plays
Films set in Rome
Sascha-Film films